Miss America 1988, the 61st Miss America pageant, was held at the Boardwalk Hall in Atlantic City, New Jersey on September 19, 1987, on NBC Network.

Pageant winner Kaye Lani Rae Rafko of Michigan became a registered nurse, and has done many years of volunteer work for medical charities and hospices. She co-hosts a public access television series called Only In Monroe for MPACT.

Among the contestants was Miss South Carolina, television personality Nancy O'Dell, entered as Nancy Humphries.

Results

Order of announcements

Top 10

Awards

Preliminary awards

Non-finalist awards

Judges
Frank Deford
Judith Ford
Jack Grossbart
Rupert Holmes
Anita Mann
Martina Arroyo
Melba Moore
Bill G. Young

Candidates

References

External links
 Miss America official website

1988
1987 in the United States
1988 beauty pageants
1987 in New Jersey
September 1987 events in the United States
Events in Atlantic City, New Jersey